The 2015 Vo Vietnam World Championship were the fourth edition of the Vovinam VietVoDao World Championship, and were held in Algiers, Algeria from 29 July to 2 August 2015.

Medal summary

Medal table

References

2015 in Algerian sport
2015 in martial arts
Sports competitions in Algiers